Anthony Ward Clare (24 December 1942 – 28 October 2007) was an Irish psychiatrist and a presenter of radio and television programmes. He was the presenter of the radio series In the Psychiatrist's Chair, an interview and discussion show, which aired on BBC Radio 4.

Career
Clare was born in Dublin to Agnes (née Dunne) and Ben Clare, and was educated at Gonzaga College. He read medicine at University College Dublin (UCD), where he was an auditor of the Literary and Historical Society, and graduated in 1966. During his time at UCD, he won the 1964 Observer Mace debating competition, speaking in a team with Patrick Cosgrave. Following initial training in psychiatry at St Patrick's Hospital, Dublin, he moved to the Institute of Psychiatry (now part of King's College London) at the Maudsley Hospital in London, where he studied under Professor Michael Shepherd. Clare held a doctorate in medicine and a master's degree in philosophy, and was a fellow of the Royal College of Psychiatrists.

Author of several popular books on psychiatry, Clare held the positions of Professor and Head of Department of Psychological Medicine at St Bartholomew's Hospital, London, Professor of Clinical Psychiatry at Trinity College Dublin and Medical Director of St Patrick's Hospital, Dublin. At the time of his death, Clare was serving as Consultant General Adult Psychiatrist at St. Edmundsbury Hospital in Lucan, County Dublin.

In the 1980s and 1990s, Clare was the best-known psychiatrist in Britain. His first media appearances were on the light-hearted BBC Radio 4 discussion programme Stop the Week. He was also for many years the voice of the BBC popular science programme QED. Clare became famous for his probing interviews on radio and television with well-known figures such as Bob Monkhouse and Paddy Ashdown in several series of In the Psychiatrist's Chair, which ran from 1982.

Personal life and death

As a young man Clare lost his Catholic faith and later explained why in a newspaper interview.
I can't really believe in a God that can suddenly and haphazardly intervene during one moment of history, causing air crashes, genocide and famine.

Clare married Jane Hogan in 1966 and they had seven children together.

He was due to retire from his post as Consultant General Adult Psychiatrist at St Edmundsbury Hospital (now St. Patrick's Mental Health Services) in Lucan, County Dublin when he died suddenly of a heart attack in Paris at the age of 64.

Television programmes
 QED
 After Dark
In the Psychiatrist's Chair

Radio programmes
In the Psychiatrist's Chair
Father Figures
All in the Mind

Books
Depression and How to Survive It (Co-written with Spike Milligan)
Lovelaw
In the Psychiatrist's Chair I, II & III
On Men: Masculinity in Crisis
Psychiatry in Dissent: Controversial Issues in Thought and Practice

References

External links

Robin McKie, "The chair man: Anthony Clare" The Observer, 13 May 2001.
Obituary in The Times, 31 October 2007
 Daily Telegraph obituary
 Caroline Richmond, Guardian obituary (includes additional section on his hosting of the After Dark television programme), 31 October 2007
Morton Schatzman, "Professor Anthony Clare" (obituary), The Independent, 31 October 2007
Ed Carty, "Anthony Clare, the psychiatrist with the chair, dies aged 64", The Independent, 31 October 2007
Richard Ingrams, "Richard Ingrams' Week: Memories of my time in the psychiatrist's chair", The Independent, 3 November 2007

1942 births
2007 deaths
Auditors of the Literary and Historical Society (University College Dublin)
Fellows of the Royal College of Psychiatrists
Academics of Barts and The London School of Medicine and Dentistry
Academics of Trinity College Dublin
Alumni of King's College London
Irish psychiatrists
Medical doctors from Dublin (city)
Television presenters from the Republic of Ireland
People educated at Gonzaga College
Former Roman Catholics